Eivinas Zagurskas (born September 9, 1989 in Kėdainiai) is a Lithuanian footballer,  currently playing for Víkingur Ólafsvík in the Icelandic Pepsideild as a midfielder.

Career

Club
In the summer 2010, he joined Górnik Łęczna on a one-year contract.

In July 2011, he signed a contract with Wisła Płock.

In January 2013, he signed a contract with Paniliakos.

National team
He was also a part of the Lithuania national under-21 football team.

References

External links 
 
 

1989 births
Living people
Lithuanian footballers
Górnik Łęczna players
Wisła Płock players
FK Sūduva Marijampolė players
FK Žalgiris players
FC Vilnius players
Paniliakos F.C. players
Association football midfielders
Expatriate footballers in Poland
Lithuanian expatriate sportspeople in Poland
Sportspeople from Kėdainiai
Ungmennafélagið Víkingur players
Lithuanian expatriate sportspeople in Greece
Expatriate footballers in Greece
Lithuanian expatriate sportspeople in Norway
Expatriate footballers in Norway
Lithuanian expatriate sportspeople in Iceland
Expatriate footballers in Iceland